Davis Phinney (born July 10, 1959) is a retired professional road bicycle racer from the United States. He won 328 races in the 1980s and 1990s, a record for an American, including two Tour de France stages. He has worked in media since retiring as a professional cyclist. He was diagnosed with Parkinson's disease at age 40.

Career

Racing cyclist
He was a brazen sprinter and a star of the 7-Eleven Cycling Team in the 1980s and early '90s, and is the leader in race victories by an American, with 328. In 1986, he became the second American to win a stage at the Tour de France, while riding for American-based 7-Eleven. His racing career spanned two decades and included two stage victories in the Tour de France, a United States National Road Race Championships title, and the 1984 Olympic Bronze Medal in the Men's 100 km Team Time Trial along with Ron Kiefel, Roy Knickman, and Andrew Weaver.

Aside from Greg LeMond, Phinney is the only American rider to make a legitimate run at winning the Green Jersey in the Tour de France.  LeMond and he are the only two American riders to come in the top three of this classification. Phinney finished second in the points classification during the 1988 Tour de France.

Career after racing
Since retiring from cycling, Phinney has remained active as a cycling sports commentator, public speaker, journalist, and avid Nordic ski racer.

Family
He is married to champion cyclist Connie Carpenter-Phinney, with whom he has two children, Taylor and Kelsey. On  August 9, 2007, Taylor became the Junior World Time Trial champion at the 2007 UCI Junior World Road and Track Championships held in Aguascalientes, Mexico, and on September 29, 2010, he became the 2010 UCI Under 23 World Time Trial champion.

Parkinson's disease
Phinney was diagnosed with Parkinson's disease at age 40, and established the Davis Phinney Foundation in 2004, a registered 501(c)(3) nonprofit organization. As Taylor was about to go to the Beijing Olympics late in 2008, Davis underwent deep brain stimulation in an effort to control some of his symptoms. Jaimie Henderson, a neurosurgeon at Stanford University Medical Center, implanted two electrodes  into either side of Phinney's brain, powered by a pacemaker in his chest. According to ESPN, the procedure was risky and not promising, but worked instantly. Phinney explained:

The doctor said, 'OK, let's try a little current now, and just like that, all these muscles that had been at war with each other suddenly were at peace. It was like Armistice Day. It was just like, 'Oh … my … god!' I looked at my wife and she was crying. She said, 'I haven't seen your smile in a year!'

By 2012, the disease was setting in again. Doctors told him the brain pacemaker could turn the clock back on the progress of Parkinson's five years. Four years after the surgery, while Phinney did not shake like he used to, his balance was severely compromised.

Major results 

1981
 Coors Classic
1st  Points classification
1st Stage 6 
1982
 1st  Points classification Coors Classic
1983
 1st  Team time trial, Pan American Games 
 Coors Classic
1st  Points classification
1st Stages 2, 4, 5b & 9 
1984
 1st Stage 7 GP Tell
 1st  Points classification Coors Classic
 Olympic Games
3rd  Team time trial
5th Road race
1985
 Coors Classic
1st  Points classification
1st Stages 3 & 13 
 5th Milano–Torino
 8th Overall Étoile de Bessèges
1986
 1st Stage 3 Tour de France
 Coors Classic
1st  Points classification
1st Stages 2b, 4b & 11b
1987
 1st Stage 12 Tour de France
 9th Overall Coors Classic
1st  Points classification
1st Stage 10 
1988
 1st  Overall Coors Classic
1st Prologue, Stages 4b, 6a & 8 
 1st Stage 6 Tour de Romandie
1989
 5th Overall Tour de Trump
1st Stages 8 & 9
1990
 3rd Kuurne–Brussels–Kuurne
1991
 1st  Road race, National Road Championships
 1st Fitchburg Longsjo Classic
 Tour DuPont
1st  Points classification
1st Stage 1 
1993
 1st Fitchburg Longsjo Classic

Grand Tour general classification results timeline

References

External links
 Davis Phinney Foundation
 Davis Phinney: The Happiness of Pursuit
 
 Official Tour de France results for Davis Phinney
 

1959 births
Living people
American male cyclists
American cycling road race champions
American Tour de France stage winners
Boulder High School alumni
Cyclists at the 1984 Summer Olympics
Olympic bronze medalists for the United States in cycling
People with Parkinson's disease
Cycling announcers
Cycling journalists
Sportspeople from Boulder, Colorado
Medalists at the 1984 Summer Olympics
Cyclists from Colorado
Pan American Games medalists in cycling
Medalists at the 1983 Pan American Games
Pan American Games gold medalists for the United States